Michael Watson (born 1984) is a Canadian professional online poker player from St. John's, Newfoundland and Labrador who won a World Poker Tour title in July 2008. He also finished 2nd in the $1,500 No Limit Hold'em – Mixed Max (Event #58) of the 2014 World Series of Poker.

On July 11, 2014, Mike Watson is ranked #24 on the Global poker index (he ranked as high as #2 in June 2013)

World Poker Tour 
Watson was the winner of the World Poker Tour (WPT) Bellagio Cup IV, in A final table made up of  Gabriel Thaler, John Phan, Ralph Perry, fellow professional online poker player Luke "IWEARGOGGLES" Staudenmaier and David Benyamine who Watson defeated during heads-up play to take the title, bracelet and $1,673,770.

As of 2014, his total live tournament winnings exceed $7,200,000.

European Poker Tour 
Watson finished 3rd in 2008 EPT London High Roller Showdown, taking home $422,750. The final table included notable professionals Jason Mercier, John Juanda, Scotty Nguyen, David Benyamine, and Isabelle Mercier.

He won the PokerStars Caribbean Adventure in 2016 for over $700,000.

References

External links
 Mike "SirWatts" Watson Official blog
 Hendon Mob profile

1984 births
Canadian poker players
World Poker Tour winners
European Poker Tour winners
People from St. John's, Newfoundland and Labrador
Living people